BGN may refer to:

 Biglycan, a protein coded by the BGN gene 
 Bulgarian lev, the currency of Bulgaria by ISO 4217 code
 The Western Balochi language (ISO code: bgn)
 The United States Board on Geographic Names 
 Belaya Gora Airport, Yakutia, Russia
 Blessed George Napier Roman Catholic School, Banbury, UK 
 802.11b/g/n, a designation indicating device support for certain wireless computer networking standards 
 Busch Grand National, former name for the NASCAR Xfinity Series